The 2013 Pan American Race Walking Cup was held in Ciudad de Guatemala, Guatemala.  The track of the Cup runs in the Avenida Simeón Cañas, Zona 2.

A detailed report was given by Fernando Ruiz Del Valle.

Complete results were published.

Medallists

Results

Men's 20 km

Individual

Team

Men's 50 km

Individual

Team

Men's 10 km (Junior)

Individual

Team

Women's 20 km

Individual

Team

Women's 10 km (Junior)

Individual

Team

Participation
The participation of 144 athletes from 19 countries is reported. 

 (4)
 (14)
 (4)
 (1)
 (17)
 (3)
 (4)
 (6)
 (17)
 (4)
 (12)
 (1)
 México (19)
 (1)
 Panamá (2)
 Perú (4)
 (6)
 (13)
 (9)

See also
 2013 Race Walking Year Ranking

References

Pan American Race Walking Cup
Pan American Race Walking Cup
Pan American Race Walking Cup
International athletics competitions hosted by Guatemala